Athanasius Yohan (K.P. Yohannan) is the founder and president of GFA World earlier known as  Gospel for Asia, a large non-profit missions organization with a focus on India and Asia. He is also the founding Metropolitan Bishop of Believers Eastern Church with the religious title and name of Moran Mor Athanasius Yohan I (Earlier Believers Church). Yohannan has authored over 200 books on Christian living and missions.

Biography

Early life and education 
K.P. Yohannan was born in 1950 and raised in a St. Thomas Syrian Christian (Mar Thoma Syrian Church) family in Kerala, India. At age eight he became a follower of Jesus. He was 16 when he joined the Operation Mobilization, an evangelical missions movement, and served them for eight years in the Indian subcontinent.
Through an invitation from Dr. W.A. Criswell, Yohannan moved to the United States in 1974 for theological studies at Criswell College (at the time Criswell Bible Institute) in Dallas, Texas. He graduated with a B.A. in Biblical Studies, becoming the school’s first international student to graduate. Eventually he also was conferred an honorary degree of divinity by Hindustan Bible Institute and College in Chennai, India. Though his degree is honorary, he often uses the title of "doctor" when in the United States.

Ministry 
Six months into his undergraduate degree, Yohannan became an ordained clergyman and served in the clergy of a Native American Southern Baptist church for four years near Dallas, Texas. In 1979, Yohannan and his wife Gisela started an organization known today as Gospel for Asia, based in Carrollton, Texas until 2014, when it moved to Wills Point, Texas. In the first year, they helped provide financial support and training to 24 missionaries. In 1979, Yohannan resigned from his church to devote attention to full-time mission work. In 1981, he started a chapter of Gospel for Asia (GFA) in Kerala, India, and in 1983 created an Indian headquarters in Tiruvalla. GFA supports over 50 Bible colleges in various countries.

Family 
Yohannan is married to Gisela, who served with him in Operation Mobilization. They met in 1973. In 1974, they were married in Germany, Gisela’s birth country. They have two children, Daniel and Sarah.

Name change 
In August 2018, Believers Eastern Church announced that bishops and leaders in the church would take up "ecclesiastical" names in church duties, and Yohannan henceforth would be known as Moran Mor Athanasius Yohan Metropolitan with respect to church duties. Across the United States and the Western world, he continues to go by K. P. Yohannan as an author, speaker and missionary statesman.

Believers Eastern Church 
Believers Eastern Church (previously Believers Church) is self-described as "evangelical in nature and outlook, oriental in worship, democratic in function, and orthodox in governance and character" and has congregations and parishes worldwide. The church has an episcopal governance. Believers Eastern Church adheres to the biblical faith taught in the historic tenets of the Apostles Creed, the Nicene Creed, and the unbroken line of the “one, holy, catholic and apostolic Church.”  The church holds Christ as the head of the Church (Col 1:18); accordingly it is governed by a committee of Bishops, the Synod, with one central Bishop holding the honorary title of "first among equals". Believers Eastern Church is administratively based in the state of Kerala in southwestern India. In 2015, the church reported it re-organized into 33 dioceses, decreasing from the 36 dioceses reported by Smith in 2009. According to Believers Eastern Church, its membership includes over 3.5 million people in 10 countries speaking a hundred languages. The Church currently has 30 Bishops, and the current Metropolitan Bishop is Athanasius Yohan I.

Print and radio 
Yohannan is the author of 39 books published in the U.S. and over 200 books published in India. His books include Revolution In World Missions.

Yohannan's radio broadcast "Road to Reality" is heard on over 900 radio stations in the U.S., Canada, U.K., and Australia. He has also been heard on the Athmeeya Yathra (Spiritual Journey) daily broadcast for the past 25 years. This is broadcast in 14 nations in 113 Asian languages. Athmeeya Yathra now includes a television station and print media.

Gospel for Asia 
Gospel for Asia is among the world's largest missionary organizations, adhering to Yohannan's belief in the efficiency and efficacy of “national missionaries”, or missionaries that are native to the nation or culture they serve. The organization’s primary mission fields include those that live in the “10/40 Window”, referring to the longitudinal coordinates of areas in west Africa, India and east Asia.
 Yohannan credits his early work in his native India as inspiration for his focus on the poor and underserved in this region. He states: “In my head I knew all the answers, and Bible became the tool of the trade for me that I would use to teach and preach and I was doing very well. People liked my sermons, but finally I said to myself, ‘I’m not the same person I was when the Lord called me to serve Him. I’m not the same person that I was that walked on the streets of North India weeping over the lost and perishing millions and stayed up all night praying and weeping over a world map. The Lord was gracious enough to talk to us very lovingly, and I realized that he wanted me to go back to America and speak to the ‘Body of Christ’ about the possibility of seeing countries like India, Burma and Bhutan, turn to Christ if only they would become unselfish in praying and helping these brothers by becoming senders.”

From its inception, Gospel for Asia has held to Yohannan's conviction about operating national missionaries. The ministry discourages direct missions from outside countries or people-groups, instead training and equipping missionaries from within distinct cultures. To accomplish this, Gospel for Asia claims to have over 56 Bible schools in 10 countries, training over 9,000 ministers. In all, Gospel for Asia claims to have trained over 16,000 national missionaries.

In addition to training national missionaries, Gospel for Asia includes other ministries such as Bridge of Hope (child sponsorship), Jesus Wells (clean water wells), Bible translation, radio and television broadcasts, disaster relief and refugee camp aid.

Controversies

Income tax raid 
In November 2020, the India Income Tax Department raided the residence and offices of KP Yohannan, seizing Rs 57 Lakh (5,700,000 Indian Rupees, about $78,147 US) from a car boot. The Ministry of Home Affairs had barred the Believers Church and three other associated N.G.O.s from accepting foreign funds. It was claimed in 2008 that the church received over Rs 1,000 crore (10,000,000,000 Indian Rupees, about $137,100,000 US) in foreign funds over an 18-year span.

Court rulings in India 
The operations of Gospel for Asia and Believers Church were scrutinized after Believers Church purchased a  rubber estate in Kerala, India. Opponents claimed the church had diverted foreign funds to amass land for itself and for uses other than declared purposes. It was further alleged that the rubber estate, which Believers Church purchased from Harrison's Malayalam, Ltd., was on government leasehold and therefore not saleable. Hence, Believers Church was accused of illegally holding government land. At a later time, Harrison's Malayalam was accused of forging their land title, leading to continued debate about the legality of the sale.

Former Ernakulam District Collector Dr. M.G. Rajamanickam, who was appointed as Government Special Officer to confiscate illegal and excess estate lands under the custody of various companies, had issued an order in May, 2015, confiscating the 2,268 acre of land from Believers’ Church." However, the ruling has been appealed and now is further complicated by the local government's desire to build an airport on this estate, as reported by local news outfits. However, it also was reported that "The government does not need permission from K P Yohannan to set up airport in the Cheruvally estate, BJP national executive member V Muraleedharan said."

Yohannan says that the claims were politically motivated and that the workings of Gospel for Asia and Believers Church are transparent. Further, the rubber estate is an investment to help fund social services among underdeveloped communities and not a personal land grab as opponents have claimed.

The controversies about the estate purchase have been cleared by the Kerala, India, High Court. The findings by Dr. Rajamanickam in his report were completely rejected by the court. The court came down heavily on the government and the officer for playing "robin hood"  with the owners of the estate. A long standing controversy for Believers Church comes to an end with a clean verdict from the high court of Kerala.

US Federal lawsuits 
In 2017 there were two RICO anti-fraud lawsuits active against Gospel for Asia, naming Yohannan and other Gospel for Asia leaders as defendants. One of these lawsuits went to arbitration and the other was settled after three years in which both parties agreed that “all donations designated for use in the field were ultimately sent to the field.” Gospel for Asia denies any wrongdoing.

References

External links 
 
 Believers Eastern Church page on Moran Mor Athanasius Yohan Metropolitan (formerly known as K. P. Yohannan)
 Gospel For Asia

1950 births
Living people
Criswell College alumni
Indian evangelicals
Indian Protestant missionaries
People from Kerala
Protestant missionaries in India
Writers from Kerala